Gentry Brothers Farm is a Thoroughbred racing and training stable owned by brothers Robert and Bruce Gentry until Bob's 2013 death.  The Gentry brothers have been involved in both quarter horse and Thoroughbred horse racing for over 35 years.  The Gentrys maintained a  farm in Lexington, Kentucky as well as a  ranch in Dickens, Texas. The brothers co-founded Heritage Place in Oklahoma City, a venue for selling quarterhorses.

Horses
Their horses were estimated to have earned more than eight million dollars. The Gentry brothers owned:

 Sweet Diva, owned by Robert a stakes winner who set a track record at Remington Park
 Fearless Freda owned by Robert
 Commitisize 1998 graded stakes winner
 Princess Rooney, whom Robert purchased for $130,000 in 1995
 Goodbye Heart, the dam of Commitisize
 Bruces Blue Lou, the dam of Receiver, was purchased by Bruce Gentry in 1989 for $57,000.

A full brother to Receiver was sold by the Gentrys for $400,000 at the 1997 Keeneland September yearling sale.

References

American racehorse owners and breeders
Horse farms in Kentucky
Buildings and structures in Dickens County, Texas
Economy of Lexington, Kentucky